The Devil Thumbs a Ride is a 1947 film noir directed by Felix E. Feist and featuring Lawrence Tierney and Ted North.

Plot
Steve Morgan (Tierney) is a charming sociopath who has just robbed and killed a cinema cashier. Seeking to escape, he hitches a ride to Los Angeles with unsuspecting Jimmy 'Fergie' Ferguson (North). Part way the pair stops at a gas station and pick up two women. Encountering a roadblock, Morgan persuades the party to spend the night at an unoccupied beach house. The police close in after Morgan killed one of the women.

Cast
 Lawrence Tierney as Steve Morgan
 Ted North as Jimmy "Fergie" Ferguson
 Nan Leslie as Beulah Zorn, alias Carol Demming
 Betty Lawford as Agnes Smith
 Andrew Tombes as Joe Brayden, Night Watchman
 Harry Shannon as Detective Owens, San Diego Police
 Glen Vernon as Jack Kenny, Gas Station Attendant
 Marian Carr as Diane Ferguson
 William Gould as Police Capt. Martin, San Diego Police
 Josephine Whittell as Diane's mother
 Dick Elliott as Mack Wilkins, San Clemente Police (uncredited)
 Phil Warren as Pete, Roadblock Motorcycle Cop
 Robert Malcolm as Newport Deputy Sheriff Grover

Reception

Critical response
When the film was released The New York Times film critic identified as BC (Bosley Crowther) dismissed the film: "The Devil Thumbs a Ride, which came to the Rialto yesterday, is a distinctly pick-up affair ... In the role of the thug Lawrence Tierney, who played Dillinger a couple of years back, behaves with the customary arrogance of all gunmen in cheap Hollywood films. It is pictures like this which give the movies a black eye and give us a pain in the neck."

In 2007, film critic Dennis Schwartz was also critical of the film: "Felix E. Feist (The Man Who Cheated Himself/Donovan's Brain/The Threat) directs and writes this ugly hitchhiker crime drama that has little entertainment value, the characters other than the main protagonist are too incredibly dull to ring true and it has no redeeming social value. The low-budget programmer is helped only by its noir look, fast-pace, the manic performance by Lawrence Tierney and the offbeat nature of its story ... Feist fills both the police car and the hitcher's car with noir characters, but it ends up as a ride to nowhere."

See also
 Detour (1945)
 The Hitch-Hiker (1953)
 The Desperate Hours (1955)

References

External links
 
 
 
 
 

1947 films
1940s thriller films
American thriller films
American black-and-white films
Film noir
Films based on American novels
Films directed by Felix E. Feist
RKO Pictures films
Films scored by Paul Sawtell
1940s American films